Jamie Trenchfield (born 23 November 1987) is a Jamaican cricketer. He played in one first-class match for the Jamaican cricket team in 2007.

See also
 List of Jamaican representative cricketers

References

External links
 

1987 births
Living people
Jamaican cricketers
Jamaica cricketers